Vasile Milea (1 January 1927 – 22 December 1989) was a Romanian politician and military general who was Nicolae Ceaușescu's Minister of Defence during the Romanian Revolution of 1989 and was involved in the reprisal phase of the Revolution that caused the deaths of 162 people.

Milea committed suicide. However, several members of his family claimed that he was killed on the orders of Ceaușescu. Milea was already in severe disfavour for sending troops to quell the uprising in Timișoara without ammunition.  Whatever the case, Milea's death caused the rank-and-file soldiers to go over almost en masse to the revolution, effectively ending the Communist rule in Romania.

A report from 2005 after a full investigation including a post-mortem concluded that Milea killed himself using the weapon of one of his attendants. It was suggested that he only tried to incapacitate himself in order to be relieved from office, but the bullet hit an artery and he died soon afterwards.

A boulevard in Sector 6 of Bucharest used to be named after him until 2021. A street in Ploiești is still named after him, as well as a central square in Pitești.

References

Works
 Vasile Milea, Victor Atanasiu, România în anii primului război mondial: caracterul drept, eliberator al participării României la război, vol. 2, Ed. Militară, Bucharest, 1987.  

1927 births
1989 suicides
Chiefs of the General Staff of Romania
People from Argeș County
People of the Romanian Revolution
Romanian Land Forces generals
Romanian Ministers of Defence
Romanian communists
Members of the Great National Assembly
Deaths by firearm in Romania